Lichtaart is a village in Belgium, in the province of Antwerp and municipality of Kasterlee. The village is situated near the town, Antwerp. Lichtaart bordered by the Rivers, Nete and Kaliebeek. In 1977, Lichtaart had an area of 25 km ² and had 4229 inhabitants. Lichtaart is notable for the theme park, Bobbejaanland and the folk singer, Bobbejaan Schoepen.

Demographics

Growth of population

Landmarks
The neo-Romanesque church (1864) in the village has a large, gothic tower (16th century) and a bell housing from the 17th century.
Bobbejaanland, Theme Park

Famous residents
 Bobbejaan Schoepen
 Louis Croenen

References

Populated places in Antwerp Province
Kasterlee